Shotwell is an image organizer designed to provide personal photo management for the GNOME desktop environment. In 2010, it replaced F-Spot as the standard image tool for several GNOME-based Linux distributions, including Fedora in version 13 and Ubuntu in its 10.10 Maverick Meerkat release.

Features
Shotwell can import photos and videos from a digital camera directly. Shotwell automatically groups photos and videos by date, and supports tagging. Its image editing features allow users to straighten, crop, eliminate red eye, and adjust levels and color balance. It also features an auto "enhance" option that will attempt to guess appropriate levels for the image.

Shotwell allows users to publish their images and videos to Flickr, Piwigo, and YouTube. Shotwell can also set the desktop wallpaper.

Technical information
The Yorba Foundation wrote Shotwell in the Vala programming language. It imports photos using the libgphoto2 library, similar to other image-organizers such as F-Spot and gThumb.

See also

 digiKam – digital photo manager by KDE
 gThumb
 Comparison of image viewers

References

External links

 

Image organizers
Free image organizers
Free image viewers
Free photo software
Free software programmed in Vala
Graphics software that uses GTK
Linux image viewers
2009 software
Software that uses Meson
Software using the LGPL license